Nelson Bay Cave also known as Wagenaar's Cave is a Stone Age archaeological site located on the Robberg Peninsula and facing Nelson's Bay near Plettenberg Bay in South Africa, and showing evidence of human occupation as far back as 125,000 years ago.

In the same area are two other Stone Age caves, Hoffman’s/Robberg Cave and Matjes River rock shelter which lies about 14 kilometres north at Keurboomstrand. Robberg shows notches, caves and other erosional features caused mainly by wave-cutting at various times in its past, but also due to lithological variation, bedding and characteristics of the bedrock. The cave developed in a breccia often found at the contact between Silurian Table Mountain Series quartzite and Cretaceous Uitenhage Series quartzitic sandstone. Excavations were carried out in 1964-5 by Ray R. Inskeep and again in 1970-1 by Inskeep and Richard G. Klein. The geology and geomorphology of Robberg were well documented by John Rogers in 1966.

The cave has yielded rich archaeological material covering its intermittent Middle and Later Stone Age occupation dating from a few hundred to more than 125,000 BP. The cave was abandoned between 40,000 to 20,000 BP during the last ice age when the sea level here dropped some 130 metres, the coastline moving about  seaward. From 22,000 to 14,000 BP extensive grasslands covered the coastal plateau in the Plettenberg Bay area with no closed evergreen climax forest. Animals that roamed this grassland included giant buffalo, an equine close to the quagga, springbok and alcelaphine antelopes: blesbok/bontebok, wildebeest, hartebeest and a giant alcelaphine. Bones from all these herbivores have been recorded in the cave's middens.

The cave occupants enjoyed a variety of food types, ranging from birds and their eggs including ostriches, mammals, plants, fruits and corms to tidal creatures and shellfish, Perna perna and Scutellastra cochlear being collected most frequently. Occasionally Cape fur seals from the nearby colony, bushpigs, bushbuck and Cape buffalo were also eaten occasionally. The various remains resulting in large middens dating back some 5,000 years, while older remains are thought to have been washed away by rising sea levels. Artefacts range from Stone Age tools (bladelets, bladelet cores, backed bladelets and scrapers, while worked bone and ostrich eggshell beads are also present) to pottery made about 2 000 years ago -  the pottery shards and remains of sheep and cattle tell of Khoikhoi farmers who occupied the cave in recent times. Graves have been found near the mouth of the cave, the remains being in a fetal position, and decorated with shells and ochre. Study of the skeletons gives insight into the cave dwellers' diet as revealed by their teeth, and the environment of that time. Because of collapsing sections of the cave in the 1980s, measures were taken to arrest its deterioration.

References

Further reading

External links
  with Janette Deacon
 "New Excavations at Hoffman’s/Robberg Cave" - Katharine Kyriacou

Archaeological sites in South Africa
Caves of South Africa
Landforms of the Western Cape
Quartzite caves
Archaeological sites of Southern Africa